88 Kearny Street is a class-A office high-rise on Kearny Street at the southeast intersection with Post Street in the Financial District of San Francisco, California. The , 22-story tower was designed by Skidmore, Owings & Merrill, and its construction was completed in 1986.

The French Consulate General is housed in the building: Suite 600

See also

French Consulate General, San Francisco
List of tallest buildings in San Francisco

References

Financial District, San Francisco
Office buildings completed in 1986
Skyscraper office buildings in San Francisco

Skidmore, Owings & Merrill buildings
Leadership in Energy and Environmental Design gold certified buildings